The 2019 Odlum Brown Vancouver Open was a professional tennis tournament played on outdoor hard courts. It was the fourteenth (men) and seventeenth (women) editions of the tournament which was part of the 2019 ATP Challenger Tour and the 2019 ITF Women's World Tennis Tour. It took place in Vancouver, Canada between 12 and 17 August 2019.

Men's singles main-draw entrants

Seeds

 1 Rankings are as of August 5, 2019.

Other entrants
The following players received wildcards into the singles main draw:
  Liam Draxl
  Alexis Galarneau
  Ernests Gulbis
  Filip Peliwo
  Benjamin Sigouin

The following player received entry into the singles main draw as a special exempt:
  Steve Johnson

The following player received entry into the singles main draw as an alternate:
  JC Aragone

The following players received entry into the singles main draw using their ITF World Tennis Ranking:
  Jordi Arconada
  Maxime Cressy
  Lloyd Glasspool
  Colin Sinclair
  Tim van Rijthoven

The following players received entry from the qualifying draw:
  Liam Broady
  Michail Pervolarakis

The following players received entry as lucky losers:
  Taha Baadi
  Alejandro Gómez

Women's singles main-draw entrants

Seeds

 1 Rankings are as of 5 August 2019.

Other entrants
The following players received wildcards into the singles main draw:
  Carson Branstine
  Leylah Annie Fernandez
  Layne Sleeth
  Carol Zhao

The following players received entry from the qualifying draw:
  Lizette Cabrera
  Hanna Chang
  Ashley Kratzer
  Asia Muhammad
  Giuliana Olmos
  Ena Shibahara

Champions

Men's singles

 Ričardas Berankis def.  Jason Jung 6–3, 5–7, 6–4.

Women's singles

 Heather Watson def.  Sara Sorribes Tormo, 7–5, 6–4

Men's doubles

 Robert Lindstedt /  Jonny O'Mara def.  Treat Huey /  Adil Shamasdin 6–2, 7–5.

Women's doubles

 Nao Hibino /  Miyu Kato def.  Naomi Broady /  Erin Routliffe, 6–2, 6–2

References

External links
 2019 Odlum Brown Vancouver Open at ITFtennis.com
 Official website

2019 ATP Challenger Tour
2019 ITF Women's World Tennis Tour
2019 in Canadian tennis
2019
August 2019 sports events in Canada